"There Will Come Soft Rains"  is a science fiction short story by author Ray Bradbury  written as a chronicle about a lone house that stands intact in a California city that has otherwise been obliterated by a nuclear bomb, and then is destroyed in a fire caused by a windstorm. The title is from a 1918 poem of the same name by Sara Teasdale that was published during World War I and the Spanish flu pandemic. It was first published in 1950 in two different versions in two separate publications, a one-page short story in Collier's magazine and a chapter of the fix-up  novel The Martian Chronicles.

The author regarded it as "the one story that represents the essence of Ray Bradbury". Bradbury's foresight in recognizing the potential for the complete self-destruction of humans by nuclear war in the work was recognized by the Pulitzer Prize Board in conjunction with awarding a Special Citation in 2007 that noted, "While time has (mostly) quelled the likelihood of total annihilation, Bradbury was a lone voice among his contemporaries in contemplating the potentialities of such horrors." The author considered the short story as the only one in The Martian Chronicles to be a work of science fiction.

Plot
A nuclear catastrophe leaves the city of Allendale, California entirely desolate. However, within one miraculously preserved house, the daily routine continues – automatic systems within the home prepare breakfast, clean the house, make beds, wash dishes, and address the former residents without any knowledge of their current state as burnt silhouettes on one of the walls, similar to Human Shadow Etched in Stone. One afternoon, a dog is allowed into the house when it is recognized as the family pet, but it dies soon after and is incinerated.

That evening, the house recites to the absent hostess her favorite poem, "There Will Come Soft Rains" by Sara Teasdale. A windstorm blows a tree branch through a window in the kitchen, starting a fire. The house's systems desperately attempt to put out the fire, but the doomed home burns to the ground in a night. The following dawn all that remains is a single wall, from which a voice endlessly repeats the time and date.

Publication history 
The short story first appeared in the May 6, 1950 issue of Collier's magazine, and was revised and included as a chapter titled "August 2026: There Will Come Soft Rains" in Bradbury's The Martian Chronicles that was also first published in May 1950. The official publication dates for the two versions  were only two days apart. The 1997 edition of The Martian Chronicles advanced all dates in the 1950 edition by 31 years, changing the title to "August 2057: There Will Come Soft Rains".

Adaptations
 An adaptation was broadcast on June 17, 1950 as the 11th episode of Dimension X, a science-fiction radio program.
 In 1953, an adaptation of the story was published in issue 17 of the comic book Weird Fantasy, with art by Wally Wood.
 The story was made into a radio play for the X Minus One series and broadcast on December 5, 1956.
 In 1962, actor Burgess Meredith recorded this story, which was released on LP by Prestige Lively Arts (30004), along with "Marionettes, Inc.", also by Bradbury.
 in 1962, the BBC Third Programme broadcast a dramatization by Nasta Pain, with original music by John Carol Case.
 In 1975, actor Leonard Nimoy's narrations of this story and Ray Bradbury's Usher II, also from The Martian Chronicles, were released on Caedmon Records.
 In 1977, August the Fourth, 2026: There Will Come Soft Rains was broadcast on BBC Radio 4. It used the resources of the BBC Radiophonic Workshop under the direction of Malcolm Clarke.
 In 1984, Soviet studio Uzbekfilm produced "There Will Come Soft Rains" as a short animated film. (ru)
 In 1992, Lebbeus Woods adapted the story to the third issue of the comic book series Ray Bradbury Chronicles.
 In 2008, the post-apocalyptic game Fallout 3, which takes place in the irradiated remnants of Washington, DC, featured a robot in a house in Georgetown which, upon entering a command in a terminal in the house, would hover in the bedroom of the occupant's children and recite the poem for which this story is named. 
 In 2015, shortly after Leonard Nimoy's death, the concept album Soft Rains was released featuring Nimoy's 1975 reading, set to music by producer Carwyn Ellis under the pseudonym Zarelli.

Reference

External links
 
 "There Will Come Soft Rains (Budet Laskovyj Dozhd)" (1984 Soviet Animated film) on YouTube

Listen to
 "There Will Come Soft Rains/Zero Hour" on Dimension X
 "There Will Come Soft Rains/Zero Hour" on X Minus One
 The BBC Third Programme's "There Will Come Soft Rains" (1962) on  Internet Archive
 BBC Radio 4's "August 2026: There Will Come Soft Rains" (1977) on Internet Archive

1950 short stories
Science fiction short stories
Short stories by Ray Bradbury
Post-apocalyptic short stories
Novels set during World War III
Human extinction
Fiction set in 1985
Fiction set in 2026
Works originally published in Collier's
Short stories adapted into films